Transitional cell carcinoma of the ovary (TCC of the ovary) is a rare type of ovarian cancer that has an appearance similar to urothelial carcinoma (also known as transitional cell carcinoma).

Diagnosis
TCC of the ovary is diagnosed by examination of the tissue by a pathologist. It has a characteristic appearance under the microscope and distinctive pattern of immunostaining.

Pathology
It is not related urothelial carcinoma. It is in the transitional cell category of ovarian tumours which also includes malignant Brenner tumour and benign Brenner tumour.

Treatment
The main treatment is surgical resection.

Prognosis
These tumours do better than other types of epithelial tumours of the ovary.

See also
Brenner tumour

References

External links 

Ovarian cancer